Once (stylized as O11CE, also known as Disney 11 in the English and Dutch dubs) is an Argentine youth sports telenovela produced by Pol-ka Producciones in association with Disney XD Latin America, the American Disney Channel and The Walt Disney Company, starring Mariano González-Guerineau and Sebastián Athie. In the UK, Ireland, and the Netherlands, the series is known as Disney 11.

The first season had 80 episodes divided into two parts of 40 chapters each, like the second season, the third season had 60 episodes divided into three parts of 20 episodes each.

It premiered in Latin America on March 13, 2017, on the same channel and also through the high definition signal of the Disney Channel. On September 11 of the same year, Brandon Zúñiga Vega premiered on Disney Channel's standard resolution signals.

On April 11, 2017, The Walt Disney Company confirmed that the series was being renewed for a second season, which premiered in Latin America on April 30, 2018. On July 15, 2019, the third and final season premiered with the final episode broadcast November 29, 2019

Cast 
 Mariano González-Guerineau as Gabriel 'Gabo' Moreti
 Sebastián Athié as Lorenzo Guevara (†)
 Juan David Penagos as Ricardo 'Ricky' Flores
 Luan Brum Lima as André 'Dedé' Duarte
 Paulina Vetrano as Zoe Velázquez
Javier Eloy Bonanno as Joaquín Costa
Renato Quattordio as Apolodoro '14' Nikotatópulos (Season 1-2; Season invited 3
 Agustina Palma as Martina Markinson (seasons 1–2)
Fausto Bengoechea as Adrián Roca (seasons 1–2)
Tomás Blanco as Valentino Toledo (seasons 1–2)
Lucas Minuzzi as Pablo Espiga
Paulo Sánchez Lima as Mariano Galo (seasons 1–2)
Federico J. Gurruchaga as Lucas Quintana (Season 1-2; Season invited 3)
Juan Francisco Cabrera as Daniel Gratzia
Juan Baustista Herrera as Leonardo 'Leo' Palacios (Season 1, Season 2: invited, Season 3: principal)
Santiago Luna as Rafael "Rafa" Fierro (season 1-3)
Juan de Dios Ortíz as Diego Guevara (Season 1, 2; Season 3 invited)
Verónica Pelaccini as Isabel Di Marco (Season 1, 2; Season 3 recurrent)
Santiago Stieben as Vitto Voltagio
Nicolás Pauls as Francisco Velázquez
Pablo Gershanik as Amadeo Carillo
Guido Pennelli as Ezequiel Correa (Season 1 recurrent, Season 2, 3 principal)
Daniel Patiño as Martin Mejía (Season 2 principal, Season 3 recurrent)
Candelaria Grau as Celeste Brizuela (Season 1 recurrent, Season 2, 3 principal)
Joaquín Ochoa as Arturo Garrido (Season 3)
Julia Tozzi as Natalia Acosta (Season 3)
Paula Cancio as Laura Domenek (Season 3)
Bianca Zero as Delfina Soto (Season 3)
Julián Cerati as Felipe Aragón 
Beatriz Dellacasa as Amelia Moreti
Alfredo Castellani as Florensio/Franco Peloci (Season 1, 2 recurrent, Season 3 invited)
Giampaolo Samà as Giovanni Malafacce (Season 1-2)
Mariano Zabalza as Camilo Montero (Season 1-2)
Julia Dovganishina as Anna 'Anya' Safonova
 Luca Marconetti as Hans Newman
 Antonella Felici as Marcela
 Camila Sassi as Micaela
 Sandra Criolani as Grizelda 
 Elis García as Abril Alcaraz 
 Juan Ciancio as Franco Quesada 
 Constanza Espejo as Martina's mother
 Alfredo Allende as Olson
 Muni Seligmann as Alejandra "Alex" Feuder
 Gaby de Castillo as Ulises Zabaleta 
 Agostina Fabrizio as Silvia
 María Jesús Rinteria as Fernanda
 Juanma Muniagurria as Federico (season 3)

Series overview

Season 1 (2017) 

Gabriel "Gabo" Moreti (Mariano González-Guerineau), is a teenager who lives with his grandmother Amelia (Beatriz Dellacasa) in a small town in Argentina called Álamo Seco. Gabo's great passion is soccer. His great soccer aptitude does not go unnoticed by Francisco Velázquez (Nicolas Pauls), technical director of the soccer team of the prestigious Sports Academic Institute (IAD), who decides to grant him a scholarship as number 10. Gabo begins with a trip to Buenos Aires to live in the IAD. His dream is to become a great player, but what he does not know is that on this journey, destiny will also make him discover the secrets of his family history. The IAD (Sports Academic Institute) is a demanding educational center whose objective is to enhance the best skills of each student, both academic and sports. The institute has a high level of technological-sports research and thanks to this it can carry out sophisticated studies that support the sports careers of all its students. Home to Los Halcones Dorados, the best student soccer team, the IAD has suffered an unexpected setback: most of the team members have left the institution to attend other schools or join the lower divisions of professional teams. Gabo is the key to rebuilding the team but that does not fall in favor of Lorenzo Guevara (Sebastián Athie) (Player number 9) who is the star striker and the only one of the original players who remains at the Institute. Although Gabo will have to face numerous challenges at the IAD, he will not do it alone, since he has the support of his friends Ricardo "Ricky" Flores (Juan David Penagos) (Player number 7) and Andrés "Dedé" Duarte (Luan Brum) ( Player number 6), Zoe Velázquez (Paulina Vetrano) is Francisco's daughter and is Gabo's friend, Joaquín Costa (Javier Eloy Bonnano) is not a player but is a sports reporter or journalist. Throughout history, Gabo will acquire the necessary tools to establish himself as a positive leader for the group. You will know success and failure.

Season 2 (2018) 

All the hawks are happy and believe that what follows is a calmer time because they have already finished the intercup and emerged champions, but an even more important challenge awaits them: they will play the Continental tournament, a championship in which only the teams that obtained the first and second place in the Intercopa of each region of Latin America. On the other hand, the fifth-year students of the IAD have their heads focused not only on the championship, but also on diagramming their career plan: it is their last year as students and each one will have to discover what they want to do with their life. In this sense, it will be essential for them to understand that training a footballer not only involves training in sport, but also intellectually. As for Gabo, fate does not stop pulling its strings so that he can finally discover who his father is; It is the most complex crossroads of life that you will have to go through. If until now you have had to adapt to a new world, you will have to test the values, convictions and beliefs with which you were formed. At the same time, a Colombian student, Martín (Playdo number 19), arrives on an exchange to join the Falcons as reinforcement. He is a skilled number 8 that not only has a very particular personality marked by a certain tendency to obsession enhanced by an intelligence that far exceeds the average, but also hides a very dark side. Gabo will have to face Martín to keep his position at Los Halcones.

Season 3 (2019) 

Gabo's dream is close to being realized, but now he is caught in a conflict between his love for Álamo Seco, his consolidation as a professional player and the Golden Falcons are in the World Cup because they have already won the continental tournament. If you want to reach the top of football, you will have to overcome these last obstacles that will put you between your past and your future.

Production
The telenovela began production on May 29, 2016. Jorge Edelstein is the same creator who made the telenovelas Soy Luna and Bia. With the script by Javier Castro Albano, Marcos Osorio Vidal, Tom Wortley and Fernando Rivero in season 3, the direction; Sebastián Pivotto in season 1, by Nicolás Di Cocco: in seasons 2 and 3.

It is an original Pol-Ka Producciones production made in collaboration with Disney XD Latin America. The production is in charge of Pegsa, with the collaboration of Non Stop and its premiere was on March 13, 2017 throughout Latin America.

Music

References

External links 
 

2017 Argentine television series debuts
2019 Argentine television series endings
2010s Argentine television series
Television series about teenagers
Fictional association football television series
Television series by Disney
Disney XD original programming
Disney Channels Worldwide original programming
Spanish-language Disney Channel original programming